Blood on the Crown (formerly titled Storbju and Just Noise) is a 2021 Maltese-Canadian-American film directed by Davide Ferrario and starring Harvey Keitel, Malcolm McDowell, and Tom Prior.  Roland Joffé served as an executive producer of the film. The film is based on the 1919's Sette Giugno (7 June) events.

Cast
Harvey Keitel
Malcolm McDowell
Tom Prior

Release
The film was released on demand on March 9, 2021.

References

External links
 

Maltese-language films
Canadian drama films
English-language Canadian films
Maltese drama films
American drama films
Films directed by Davide Ferrario
American films based on actual events
Films set in the British Empire
Films set in 1919
2020s Canadian films
2020s American films